Skuhrov may refer to places in the Czech Republic:

Skuhrov (Beroun District), a municipality and village in the Central Bohemian Region
Skuhrov (Havlíčkův Brod District), a municipality and village in the Vysočina Region
Skuhrov (Jablonec nad Nisou District), a municipality and village in the Liberec Region
Skuhrov nad Bělou, a municipality and village in the Hradec Králové Region